J. Kenneth Campbell (born July 22, 1947) is an American film, stage, and television actor who has been cast in over 80 roles. He was born in Flushing, New York. Campbell studied acting under theatrical fight director Patrick Crean, and was an acting instructor himself at the Stratford Shakespeare Festival.

Early life 
James Kenneth Campbell II was born in Flushing, New York on July 22, 1947. The second of seven children, he was raised on Long Island and graduated from Cheshire Academy. Campbell began his studies at the University of Arizona, but left to study under Sanford Meisner.

Having been drafted into the United States Army in 1967, Campbell enlisted in the United States Marine Corps. Wounded in action during the Vietnam War, Campbell was awarded a Purple Heart and honorably discharged.

Career

Television 
Campbell has made several appearances in television shows, made-for-TV movies, miniseries, and specials. Campbell appeared on the daytime soap operas Another World and Search for Tomorrow in the 1980s. He also had guest appearances on several popular TV series through the years as well, including: The Mod Squad, The Rookies and Baa Baa Black Sheep in the 1970s. In the 1980s, he appeared in Spenser: For Hire, Matlock and Cheers. The 1990s saw him appearing in popular series L.A. Law, Touched by an Angel, Melrose Place, and Walker, Texas Ranger. Then in the 2000s, he landed guest roles in Diagnosis Murder, Charmed and Frasier.

Stage 
On stage, Campbell played the Viscount de Valvert in the 1973 musical Cyrano, and appeared in The Philadelphia Story, which ran from 1980-81 at the Vivian Beaumont Theater. In 1981 he starred as Macduff in the Broadway revival of William Shakespeare's Macbeth at the Vivian Beaumont Theater, alongside Philip Anglim, Maureen Anderman, and Kelsey Grammer. He starred as King Henry VIII in A Man for All Seasons alongside Charlton Heston in 1986 and 1987, at the Union Square Theatre, as part of the Roundabout Theatre Company. His Broadway credits included The Boys of Winter (1985), The Caine Mutiny Court-Martial (1983), The Philadelphia Story (1908), The Freedom of the City (1974), and Cyrano (1973).

In 2017, Campbell portrayed President Lyndon Baines Johnson in an Actors' Playhouse production of All the Way in Miami.

Personal life 
Campbell is a grandnephew of Clay Clement, an actor who was one of the earliest members of the Screen Actors Guild. His niece is author Kim Gruenenfelder.

Partial filmography

Notes

References

External links

Living people
American male film actors
American male stage actors
American male television actors
People from Queens, New York
20th-century American male actors
21st-century American male actors
1947 births